World 1-1 is the first level of Super Mario Bros., Nintendo's 1985 platform game for the Nintendo Entertainment System. The level was designed by Shigeru Miyamoto to be a tutorial for new players, orienting them to platform jumping and to the rest of the game. It is one of the most iconic video game levels and has been widely imitated and parodied.

Design

Design philosophy
During the third generation of video game consoles, tutorials on video game mechanics were rare, so players were oriented to a new video game by its level design. The opening sections of Nintendo Entertainment System games such as Metroid, The Legend of Zelda, and Super Mario Bros. are all designed to force players to explore the game mechanics to be able to advance.

Super Mario Bros. is the first side-scrolling video game featuring Mario, and one of the first video games directed and designed by Shigeru Miyamoto. Rather than confront the player with obstacles indiscriminately, its first level introduces the variety of hazards and objects by directing the player to interact with them while advancing.

Miyamoto explained that he designed World 1-1 to contain everything players need to "gradually and naturally understand what they're doing", to be able to play more freely, so that it becomes "their game".

Execution

At the start of World 1-1, the player controls Mario to immediately encounter a slowly approaching Goomba. According to 1UP.com, it is likely that this first enemy will kill a novice player, even though the enemy can easily be avoided by jumping over it. As very little progress is lost, the player learns from defeat and can try again. Past this Goomba comes an arrangement of blocks, a few of which are colored in gold. Bumping one of them from below releases a coin. According to Miyamoto, seeing a coin come out will "make [the player] happy" and want to repeat the action. Doing so for the second gold-colored block makes a Mushroom come out as a surprise power-up. The player has learned from the Goomba that mushroom-shaped beings are bad, so perhaps the player tries to avoid the power-up Mushroom, but the corridor of blocks foils escape. Touching the Mushroom makes Mario grow in size and strength, another positive reinforcement.

Next comes a series of four vertical warp pipe obstacles that must be jumped over. Each has a different height, subtly teaching the player that holding the jump button longer makes a higher jump. When encountering variously-sized pits, the player may discover how to use the button for running, because running makes a bigger jump across the pits. Furthermore, Miyamoto ensured that some pits have floors and can be simply jumped out of instead of killing Mario and forcing the replay of the entire level.

World 1-1 includes a few secrets that players can discover by replaying, such as a pipe leading to a bonus room and a hidden block containing a 1-up. The pipe also skips much of the level, to expedite the experienced players.

Reception
World 1-1 has been cited as one of the most iconic video game levels, described by Chris Kerr of Gamasutra as "legendary". Boston Blake of Game Rant rated it among the best opening levels in video games for having "ignited a love for gaming in the hearts of gamers around the world", and Jon Irwin of Paste Magazine described it as a "master-class in teaching players how to play".

Jeremy Parish of 1UP.com stated that "much of the game's success arose from the fact that it equipped players with the tools to master it from the very beginning." Almost all mechanics subsequently introduced in the game are variations of those in World 1-1, and the first levels of later Mario games (such as Super Mario Bros. 3) also expand upon them. Parish described it as "the most widely imitated, referenced, and parodied single level of a video game".

Legacy
The design philosophy introduced in Super Mario Bros., described as "learning through play", has been implemented in all of Miyamoto's later games. World 1-1 greatly influenced later Super Mario games, such as Super Mario 3D Worlds first level.

Variations of World 1-1 are frequently recreated as user-generated content, such as with Super Mario Maker and its sequel. Examples include an extra difficult version with dozens of twirling fire bars, a vertical climbing version, and a self-playing version.

See also
Super Mario Bros. theme
Green Hill Zone
Level design

References

External links 
 

1985 in video gaming
Fictional elements introduced in 1985
Mario (franchise)
Nintendo Entertainment System
Video game levels